The 2009 Telus Cup was Canada's 31st annual national midget 'AAA' hockey championship, played April 20–26, 2009 at the Selkirk Recreation Complex in Selkirk, Manitoba.  The Notre Dame Hounds defeated the Calgary Buffaloes 4-0 in the gold medal game to win their third national title.  The Rousseau Sports de Laval-Bourassa defeated the host Winnipeg Thrashers to win the bronze.  Winnipeg's Nolan Zajac, younger brother of National Hockey League player Travis Zajac, was the top scorer and named Most Valuable Player.

Teams

Round robin

Standings

Scores

Laval-Bourassa 5 - Moncton 4
Notre Dame 4 - Calgary 4
Winnipeg 5 - Hamilton 4
Notre Dame 5 - Laval-Bourassa 4
Calgary 4 - Hamilton 2
Winnipeg 7 - Moncton 1
Hamilton 2 - Laval-Bourassa 2
Notre Dame 11 - Moncton 3
Winnipeg 6 - Calgary 5
Moncton 5 - Hamilton 3
Calgary 3 - Laval-Bourassa 3
Notre Dame 5 - Winnipeg 3
Calgary 6 - Moncton 2
Notre Dame 9 - Hamilton 3
Winnipeg 4 - Laval-Bourassa 1

Playoffs

Semi-finals
Notre Dame 6 - Laval-Bourassa 4
Calgary 7 - Winnipeg 0

Bronze medal game
Laval-Bourassa 5 - Winnipeg 2

Gold medal game
Notre Dame 4 - Calgary 0

Individual awards
Most Valuable Player: Nolan Zajac (Winnipeg)
Top Scorer: Nolan Zajac (Winnipeg)
Top Forward: Ben Gamache (Notre Dame)
Top Defenceman: Jesse Pauls (Notre Dame)
Top Goaltender: Brett Gagnon (Winnipeg)
Most Sportsmanlike Player: Chris Collins (Calgary)

Road to the Telus Cup

Atlantic Region
Tournament held April 3–5, 2009 at Saint John, New Brunswick

Championship Game
Moncton 5 - Cornwall 4
Moncton advances to Telus Cup

Quebec
Ligue de Hockey Midget AAA du Quebec Championship
Rousseau Sports de Laval-Bourassa vs Trois-Rivières
Best-of-7 series played March 31-April 7, 2009
Laval-Bourassa wins series 4-0 and advances to Telus Cup

Central Region
Tournament held March 30-April 5, 2009 at Burlington, Ontario

Semi-finals
Hamilton 8 - Sault Ste. Marie 4
Oakville 5 - Burlington 0

Championship Game
Hamilton 8 - Oakville 6
Hamilton advances to Telus Cup

West Region
Tournament held April 2–5, 2009 at Swift Current, Saskatchewan

Championship Game
Notre Dame 8 - Winnipeg 2
Notre Dame advances to Telus Cup

Pacific Region
Calgary Buffaloes vs Vancouver North West Giants
Best-of-3 series played April 3–5, 2009
Game 1: Calgary 3 - Vancouver 1
Game 2: Vancouver 6 - Calgary 3
Game 3: Calgary 3 - Vancouver 2
Calgary wins series and advances to Telus Cup

See also
Telus Cup

External links
2009 Telus Cup Home Page
Road to the 2009 Telus Cup

Telus Cup
Telus Cup
Telus Cup 2009
April 2009 sports events in Canada
Telus Cup 2009
2009 in Manitoba